Champ is the surname of:

 Cameron Champ (born 1995), American golfer
 Éric Champ (born 1962), French former rugby union player
 Henry Champ (1937–2012), Canadian broadcast journalist
 Leanne Champ (born 1983), English football player and coach
 Ricky Champ (born 1980), English actor
 Vince Champ (born 1961), American comedian and convicted serial rapist
 William Champ (1808–1892), English soldier and politician, first Premier of Tasmania